Þorvaldur "Toddy" Örlygsson (born 2 August 1966) is an Icelandic former footballer who played as a midfielder. After retiring, he has worked as a manager, with his most recent side being Icelandic club Keflavík. He is the younger brother of former international player Ormarr Örlygsson.

Þorvaldur started at Knattspyrnufélag Akureyrar and played most of his career in England, first in the Premier League for Nottingham Forest and later for First Division clubs Stoke City and Oldham Athletic before returning to Iceland.

Career
"Toddy" arrived at Nottingham Forest in December 1989 for a fee of £175,000 from KA Akureyri after impressing Brian Clough. Þorvaldur took a while to make an impact and it wasn't until 1992 that he established himself in Forest's line-up. He played in 23 matches during the 1992–93, the first season of the Premier League which saw Forest suffer relegation. New manager Frank Clark decided to release Þorvaldur and in August 1993 he joined Stoke City on a free transfer.

He was signed by manager Lou Macari as a replacement for Kevin Russell. He soon made an impression on the supporters with a fine performance away at his former club Nottingham Forest. A number of fine goals earned him a great rapport with the supporters and he became a popular player at the Victoria Ground. He scored 11 goals in 58 appearances in 1993–94 and hit eight goals in 44 matches in 1994–95. However his relationship with the fans turned sour when he rejected a new contract offer in the summer of 1995 and consequently found himself out of the side and eventually signed for Oldham Athletic for a fee of £180,000 in December 1995. His career in England was cut short by injury in 1999 though he played again for three more years at his first club KA Akureyri as well as a year as player manager. He later became full-time manager of KA Akureyri and Fjarðabyggð was appointed manager of Fram in 2008. He spent five years with Fram before becoming manager of ÍA Akranes on 19 June 2013.

International career
He made his debut for Iceland in 1987 and went on to win 41 caps, scoring 7 goals. He played his last international match in a November 1995 European Championship qualifying match against Hungary.

Career statistics

Club
Sources:

A.  The "Other" column constitutes appearances and goals in the Anglo-Italian Cup, Full Members Cup.

International
Source:

References

External links
 Toddy Orlygsson tribute at Draw For Me The Boothen
 
 

Orlygsson, Thorvaldur
Orlygsson, Thorvaldur
Icelandic footballers
Iceland international footballers
Icelandic expatriate footballers
Orlygsson, Thorvaldur
Orlygsson, Thorvaldur
Knattspyrnufélagið Fram players
Orlygsson, Thorvaldur
Orlygsson, Thorvaldur
Icelandic football managers
Orlygsson, Thorvaldur
Orlygsson, Thorvaldur
Icelandic expatriate sportspeople in England
Knattspyrnufélagið Fram managers
Knattspyrnufélag Akureyrar players
Knattspyrnufélag Akureyrar managers
Íþróttabandalag Akraness managers
Knattspyrnudeild Keflavík managers
Úrvalsdeild karla (football) managers
Orlygsson, Thorvaldur
Orlygsson, Thorvaldur
Icelandic expatriate sportspeople in Germany
Expatriate footballers in Germany
SC Paderborn 07 players